The Secretary General of the Organization of American States is the highest position within the Organization of American States.

According to the Charter of the Organization of American States:

Secretaries General of the OAS

Assistant Secretaries General of the OAS 
William Manger (United States) (1948–1958)
William Sanders (United States) (1958–1968)
M. Rafael Urquía (El Salvador) (1968–1975)
Jorge Luis Zelaya Coronado (Guatemala) (1975–1980)
Val T. McComie (Barbados) (1980–1990)
Christopher R. Thomas (Trinidad and Tobago) (1990–2000)
Luigi R. Einaudi (United States) (2000 – July 2005)
Albert Ramdin (Suriname) (19 July 2005 – 2015)
Nestor Mendez (Belize) (17 July 2015 – present)

References 

Organization of American States
 
Secretaries-general